Mary Lorimer Beatrix Campbell, OBE (née Barnes; born 3 February 1947) is an English writer and activist who has written for a number of publications since the early 1970s. Her books include Wigan Pier Revisited (1984), Goliath: Britain's Dangerous Places (1993) and Diana, Princess of Wales: How Sexual Politics Shook the Monarchy (1998). She has also made films, including Listen to the Children (1990), a documentary about child abuse.

Early life
Campbell was born in Carlisle, Cumberland, England. She was educated at Harraby Secondary Modern School and Carlisle and County High School for Girls (grammar school), since 2008 the Richard Rose Central Academy. Her parents, Jim and Catherine Barnes, were Communist Party members. She had two younger siblings.

Personal life
Beatrix Barnes took the name Beatrix Campbell on her marriage to Bobby Campbell, a former Glasgow shipyard fitter and fiddle player, who was part of the renaissance of radical politics and music in Scotland in the early 1960s. They met in London at the end of 1966 and lived in a commune in Tower Hamlets. They divorced in 1978, but remained close friends until his death in 1998. Bobby encouraged Beatrix to get a job in journalism, and she joined him at the communist daily The Morning Star, formerly The Daily Worker, where he was the boxing correspondent. She became a sub-editor and later a reporter. She became deeply committed to the women's liberation movement in 1970, and from that time was oriented towards women and women's issues. Having come out as a lesbian aged 23, Campbell subsequently married a woman, with no thought given, she stated, to the distinction between 'civil partnership' and 'marriage'.

Working and political life

Campbell was fourteen when, in 1961, she took part in the Campaign for Nuclear Disarmament's march from Aldermaston to London in protest against nuclear weapons, and was still a teenager when she joined the Communist Party. At that time, the party was deeply divided over its relationship with the Soviet Union. She belonged to the party's anti-Stalinist wing that opposed the Soviet invasion of Czechoslovakia in 1968. In London, she and Bobby Campbell joined a dissident group within the Communist Party founded by university lecturer Bill Warren that produced a critique of both Stalinism and the party's economic policy.

From the early 1970s Campbell's engagement with the Communist Party was increasingly as that of a feminist: from this perspective she challenged the tenets of the Communist Party, both its political approach to organising among women and its overall strategy. Geoff Andrews wrote of her opinions in his book End Games and New Times: The Final Years of British Communism 1964–1991 feminism now "became a priority, not subordinate to some higher goal. It was a crucial part of redefining socialism". Campbell was one of a group of journalists on The Morning Star who in the early 1970s challenged the editor to break the paper's exclusive ties to the Communist Party and the trade union movement, and open a dialogue with newly emerging social movements. After the appointment of Tony Chater as editor in 1976 Campbell felt the struggle to reform the Star had been lost, and resigned, joining the journal Marxism Today and the Gramscian New Times.

By the end of the 1970s, Campbell was working principally for Time Out, whose staff were involved in a long strike and occupation in 1981 over equal pay for all and for the right of staff to be consulted about major investments. Ultimately, she and the majority of the staff left and started the cooperatively-owned London magazine City Limits.

The emergence of the women's liberation movement changed Campbell's life. With Nell Myers, she set up a women's liberation movement group in Stratford, East London and in 1972 was in the group of women Communist Party members that founded Red Rag. It immediately opened itself up to women in the wider women's movement, describing itself not only as a Marxist but as a "feminist journal", and defining feminism as "the political movement which emerges as women's response to their own oppression". When the Communist Party banned Red Rag, the editorial collective's response was "it's not yours to ban", and the journal continued to flourish for ten years.

In the 1980s, Campbell's writing focused on the transformation of Britain by Thatcherism. She set off on a six-month journey around England and wrote a polemical critique of George Orwell's book The Road to Wigan Pier (1937) and what she saw as the myopia of sexist socialism. She investigated the Conservative Party's appeal to women. She also became associated politically and professionally with the emergence of radical municipalism, particularly in London, under the leadership of Labour's Ken Livingstone.

In 1998 Campbell reported on a Newcastle City Council report into allegations of child abuse at the Shieldfield Nursery in the city in 1993. She claimed the council inquiry was "stringent" and had found "persuasive evidence of sadistic and sexual abuse of up to 350 children". The alleged perpetrators were workers at the nursery, Dawn Reed and Christopher Lillie, who had already been cleared of multiple charges in a criminal trial in 1994. They subsequently successfully sued the Council, the "Independent Review Team" who produced the report, and the local Evening Chronicle newspaper for libel. Awarding Reed and Lillie the maximum possible damages of £200,000 each, the judge in the case made a "very rare" finding of "malice" on the part of the Independent Review Team, in that "they included in their report a number of fundamental claims which they must have known to be untrue and which cannot be explained on the basis of incompetence or mere carelessness." One of the four people on the Independent Review Team was Campbell's close working partner Judith Jones. Campbell also wrote in favour of now discredited allegations raised in the Cleveland Child sex abuse Scandal, as well as similar discredited allegations in Nottingham. On 9 February 1991 Campbell appeared on television discussion programme After Dark together with the then deputy director of Nottinghamshire social services Andy Croall and others.

Campbell stood twice as a Green Party candidate in local elections, (in the London Borough of Camden) and in the 2010 parliamentary election (in Hampstead and Kilburn constituency), where she obtained only 1.4% of the votes, the seat being held by Labour's Glenda Jackson. She also co-authored several plays with Judith Jones, including And All the Children Cried, commissioned by West Yorkshire Playhouse, and Blame, performed in the Arcola Theatre, London.

Honours and citations
Campbell has received several academic honours including honorary doctorates conferred by Salford University, Oxford Brookes University and The Open University. Her work has gained her several awards, including the Cheltenham Literature Festival Prize in 1984 for the book Wigan Pier Revisited, the Fawcett Society Prize in 1987 for the book The Iron Ladies and the First Time Producers' Award in 1990 for her Dispatches documentary film Listen to the Children.

In June 2009, Campbell was offered and accepted an OBE for 'services to equal opportunities'. Writing in The Guardian, she self-defined herself as a "republican with politics rooted in Marxism and feminism" and explained the apparent contradiction in accepting the award as:
By clinging to symbols and rituals that belong to a cruel imperial order the government compromises the gonged.

You ask yourself the question: how can I accept anything from this horrible imperial regime?

And yet, getting gonged confers recognition of "citizens" contributions' to a good society – in my case equality – and the gesture affirms our necessity; the radicals – not the royalists – are the best of the British.

In 2012, she was in the World Pride Power List of the 100 most influential gay people of the year.

Selected publications

 Sweet Freedom: Struggle for Women's Liberation, by Anna Coote, Beatrix Campbell & Christine Roche (1982), Picador Books
 Wigan Pier Revisited: Poverty and politics in the Eighties, Beatrix Campbell (1984), Virago Press
 The Iron Ladies: Why Do Women Vote Tory? by Beatrix Campbell (1987), Virago Press
 Unofficial Secrets: Child Abuse – The Cleveland Case, by Beatrix Campbell (1988), Virago Press
 Goliath: Britain's Dangerous Places, Beatrix Campbell (1993), Methuen Books
 Diana, Princess of Wales: How Sexual Politics Shook the Monarchy, by Beatrix Campbell (1998), Women's Press
 And All the Children Cried, by Beatrix Campbell and Judith Jones (2005), Oberon Books
 Agreement: The State, Conflict and Change in Northern Ireland, by Beatrix Campbell (2008), Lawrence & Wishart
 End of Equality by Beatrix Campbell (2014), Seagull.

References

External links
 
 Guardian blog profile
 

1947 births
Living people
British communists
British feminists
English journalists
British Marxists
British republicans
English women journalists
English social commentators
Communist Party of Great Britain members
Green Party of England and Wales politicians
People from Carlisle, Cumbria
The Guardian journalists
Marxist feminists
Officers of the Order of the British Empire
Communist women writers
English socialist feminists